Rodoviária do Tejo, S.A. is a regional bus company in Portugal.

History
The company was founded in 1860 as João Clara & Companhia (Irmãos) Limitada and later became Claras Transportes S.A.R.L.  In 1975, the company was nationalized as part of Rodoviária Nacional and became the 'Passenger Managing Centre' (CEP) number 4.  On February 1, 1991, the company was privatized, becoming Rodoviária do Tejo, S.A.

On 1 July 2015, the company spun off RDO - Rodoviária do Oeste, Lda to handle the Caldas da Rainha-based operations.

Territory served
Rodoviária do Tejo serves the central west area of Portugal, with operations centering on:
Caldas da Rainha
Alcobaça
Bombarral
Lourinhã
Nazaré
Peniche
Leiria
Fátima
Figueira da Foz
Marinha Grande
Ourém
Santarém
Alcoentre
Almeirim
Cartaxo
Rio Maior
Torres Novas
Abrantes
Chamusca
Tomar

References

External links
Rodoviária do Tejo

Bus companies of Portugal